Bank of Bird-in-Hand is an American bank, the first in the United States to open following the passage of the Dodd Frank Act in 2010. It was founded in Pennsylvania by a group of local Amish and non-Amish investors.

History
On November 27, 2013, the Federal Deposit Insurance Corporation approved the launch of Bank of Bird-in-Hand. At the time of opening, the Bank had $17 million in capital.

The Bank celebrated its first anniversary on December 2, 2014.

Lori Maley replaced Alan Dakey as CEO of the bank on March 1, 2017.

Assets 
On June 30, 2020, the bank reported total assets of $527.5 million, total deposits of $453.2 million, total net loans of $425.0 million, and total shareholders’ equity of $57.8 million.

Location and clientele
The Bank is located in Bird-in-Hand, Pennsylvania, in Pennsylvanian Amish Country. The Bank caters mostly to Amish borrowers, however not exclusively.

Building
The Bank includes a drive-through window designed to accommodate a horse and buggy.

References

External links
 

Banks established in 2013
Banks based in Pennsylvania
2013 establishments in Pennsylvania